Sun Yat-sen, or Place Sun Yat-sen, is a park in Montreal's Chinatown, in Quebec, Canada. The space, named after Sun Yat-sen, hosts many cultural events and other festivals. It features a bust of Sun Yat-sen.

See also
 List of parks in Montreal

References

External links
 
Parc Sun-Yat-Sen (Montréal, Canada) in Sun Yat-sen Parks in the World, publicly accessible with info on 106 parks, provided by Hong Kong Baptist University Library

Downtown Montreal
Parks in Montreal
Sun Yat-sen